The 2017 Vuelta a San Juan was a road cycling stage race that took place between 23 and 29 January. It was the 35th edition of the Vuelta a San Juan and the first time it was rated as a 2.1 event on the UCI America Tour calendar.

The race was won by Bauke Mollema for the  team; after finishing second to 's Ramūnas Navardauskas in the third stage individual time trial, Mollema took the race leader's blue jersey from Navardauskas two days later, atop the Alto Colorado – in a stage won by 's Rui Costa – and maintained a 14-second race lead to the end of the race. Second place went to Óscar Sevilla, while a further two seconds in arrears, was  rider Rodolfo Torres who completed the final podium.

Torres' teammate Egan Bernal won the green jersey for the young rider classification, while riders from the  squad claimed all the remaining jerseys: Franco Germán López won the red jersey for the mountains classification, Nicolás Naranjo won the yellow jersey for the sprints classification, while Ricardo Escuela claimed the white and violet jerseys for being the highest-placed rider from the San Juan province and Argentina as a whole.  won the teams classification, while  won five of the race's seven stages, with two wins apiece for Fernando Gaviria and Maximiliano Richeze and Tom Boonen with one.

Participating teams
As the Vuelta a San Juan was a 2.1 event, a limited number of UCI WorldTeams were able to participate in the race. In total, 26 teams participated in the race: 4 UCI WorldTeams, 6 Professional Continental teams, 10 Continental teams, and 6 national selections.

Route
The route of the 2017 Vuelta a San Juan consisted of 6 mass start stages and one individual time trial. All stages were centered around the town of San Juan. Most of the stages were relatively flat, except for stage 5, which finished on top of a  mountain, the Alto Colorado.

Stages

Stage 1
23 January 2017 — San Juan to San Juan,

Stage 2
24 January 2017 — San Juan to San Juan,

Stage 3
25 January 2017 — San Juan, individual time trial (ITT)

Stage 4
26 January 2017 — San Martín to San Martín,

Stage 5
27 January 2017 — Chimbas to Alto Colorado,

Stage 6
28 January 2017 — Pocito to Pocito,

Stage 7
29 January 2017 — San Juan to San Juan,

Classification leadership table
There were four official classifications in the 2017 Vuelta a San Juan, with four corresponding leader's jerseys. The blue jersey was for the leader in the general classification, the yellow jersey for the leader in the sprint classification, the red jersey for the leader in the mountain classification, and the green jersey for the leader in the under 23 classification.

Next to these classifications, there were subclassifications for Argentine riders, and riders from the province of San Juan, while there was also a classification for teams.

Notes

References

External links

2017
2017 in Argentine sport
January 2017 sports events in South America
2017 UCI America Tour
January 2017 events in South America